Mynagappally  is a village in Kollam district in the Indian state of Kerala.

Description

 India census, Mynagappally had a population of 39336 with 19207 males and 20129 females.

Mynagappally is located in Kunnathoor Taluk. Its location is 7 km east of Karunagappally and 6 km west of Sasthamcotta.

Government
The village is under the leadership of  UDF Party. The Mynagappally Panchayath President is Shri P M Said.

Transport
Sasthamcotta railway station is in this village.

Its western border is separated by Pallikkal River from Thodiyoor panchayath. Mynagappally panchayat shares its southern border with Thevalakkara Panchayat, its North side with Sooranad panchayat and east side with Sasthamcotta panchayat.Bus facilities are also available here. The road joining Karunagappally and kottarakkara pass through Mynagappally.

Economy
This panchayat hosts industrial activity including seven cashew factories, brick manufacturing, tile manufacturing, coir industry and matchbox industry. Four main market places service this village.

Religion
"Mannoorkkavu Devi temple", where Kathakali played most often, is there. "Vettikkadu Siva Temple"  are situated there."Kumarenchira Devi Temple " is also an important pilgrim place situated here.

Education
High Schools in Mynagappally include:

 LVHS Mynagappally
 MSHSS Mynagappally
 Boys HS Thevalakkara
OLDEST SCHOOLS
SCVLPS South Mynagappally
SCVUPS South Mynagappally

References 

Villages in Kollam district